Lipia Góra  (germ. Lindenwerder) is a village in the administrative district of Gmina Szamocin, within Chodzież County, Greater Poland Voivodeship, in west-central Poland.

References

Villages in Chodzież County